Phagomyxids are a group of obligate endoparasitic protists belonging to the subphylum Endomyxa in Cercozoa. Taxonomically, they are united under a single family Phagomyxidae, order Phagomyxida, sister to the plasmodiophores.

Ecology
Phagomyxids are mainly parasites of brown algae, but some can parasite oomycetes.

Taxonomy
The group was created in 1993 by Cavalier-Smith, when it contained only the genus Phagomyxa. Since then, Maullinia, a genus previously in Plasmodiophoridae, has joined the phagomyxids.
 Phagomyxa 
 Maullinia

References

Cercozoa families
Cercozoa orders
Endomyxa